Baía Formosa (lit. "beautiful bay") is the easternmost city in the Brazilian state of Rio Grande do Norte and the first coastal city (going south-north) of that state, lying near the border with Paraíba.

The municipality contains the  Mata da Estrela Private Natural Heritage Reserve.

Notable people
Ítalo Ferreira, world champion surfer

References

Populated places established in 1958
Populated coastal places in Rio Grande do Norte
1958 establishments in Brazil
Municipalities in Rio Grande do Norte